Shotgunning is a means of consuming a beverage, especially beer, very quickly by punching a hole in the side of the can, near the bottom, placing the mouth over the hole, and pulling the tab to open the top. The beverage quickly drains, and is quickly consumed.

Shotgunning is normally done as a competition.  The participants wait until all the others are ready until the countdown begins.  Once the countdown is finished, the participants get under way and the first one to finish consuming the beverage is the winner.

Technique

To shotgun a beverage, a small hole is punched in the side of the can, close to the bottom. In order to prevent the liquid from spilling out while the cut is made, the can is held horizontally and the hole is made in the resulting air pocket. The hole can be made with any sharp object—typically a key, bottle opener, pen or knife. The drinker then places their mouth over the hole while rotating the can straight up. When the can's tab is pulled, the liquid will quickly drain through the hole into the drinker's mouth.

See also
Binge drinking
Drinking culture
Beer bong

References

External links
How to Shotgun a Beer  - Video by Howcast
How to Shotgun a Beer - Article on wikiHow

Drinking culture